Deisy Choque Aspeti (born 9 March 1997) is a Bolivian footballer who plays as a centre back. She has been a member of the Bolivia women's national team.

Early life
Choque hails from Tropico.

International career
Choque represented Bolivia at the 2014 South American U-20 Women's Championship. At senior level, she played a friendly against Brazil in 2017.

References

1997 births
Living people
Women's association football central defenders
Bolivian women's footballers
Bolivia women's international footballers